Tiny Troubles is a 1939 Our Gang short comedy film directed by George Sidney. It was the 176th Our Gang short (177th episode, 88th talking short, 89th talking episode, and 8th MGM produced episode) that was released.

Plot
Alfalfa has a loud crying baby brother that he wants to get rid of. When out with the gang he sees what he thinks is a baby in a carriage. He puts his baby brother in that carriage and takes this "baby" back home. But the baby happens to be a midget who lives a life of crime named "Lightfingered Lester". Lester initially plays along but causes all sorts of havoc soon after including drinking beer, taunting the gang, and attempting to rob the house. Someone else finds the baby and brings him to the police station. The police then raid Alfalfa's home and take the gang in when they find Lester there. They are all taken in. They send Lester back to jail while giving the gang probation.

Cast

The Gang
 Carl Switzer as Alfalfa Switzer
 Darla Hood as Darla
 Eugene Lee as Porky
 George McFarland as Spanky
 Billie Thomas as Buckwheat

Additional cast
 Edward and Jimmy Marazoni as Junior Switzer
 Barbara Bedford as Mrs. Switzer, Alfalfa's mother
 Fred Kelsey as Police chief
 Jerry Marenghi as Light Fingered Lester
 Sue Moore as Myrtle
 Emory Parnell as Officer Clancy
 Lee Phelps as Officer O'Brien

Critical reception
In the book The Little Rascals: The Life and Times of Our Gang, film critic Leonard Maltin commented that Tiny Troubles is a "shapeless reworking" of 1929's Bouncing Babies consisting of "woefully thin stuff". He added that the film "represents the first really bad MGM Our Gang short" and that "somehow the [MGM] production staff expected an audience to swallow the idea that 11-year-old Alfalfa and 10-year-old Spanky couldn't tell the difference between an infant and a midget dressed as one." Maltin concluded by saying "embarrassment replaces laughter."

See also
 Our Gang filmography

References

External links

1939 films
American black-and-white films
1939 comedy films
Films directed by George Sidney
Metro-Goldwyn-Mayer short films
Our Gang films
1939 short films
1930s American films